Route 686, or Highway 686, may refer to:

Canada
 Alberta Highway 686
 Saskatchewan Highway 686

United Kingdom

London Buses route 686

United States
  in Florida
 SR 686A see Gateway Expressway
  in Kentucky
  in Louisiana
  in Maryland
  in Nevada
  in Ohio
  in Texas
  in Virginia